Jesse Lee Vint III (born 21 September 1940) is an American actor, film director and screenwriter.  He acted in the films Silent Running (1972), Macon County Line (1974), Black Oak Conspiracy (1977) and Forbidden World (1982).

Life and career 
Vint was born 21 September 1940 and raised in Tulsa, Oklahoma. He graduated from the Oklahoma Military Academy and later attended the University of Oklahoma where he became a lifetime member of the Phi Gamma Delta fraternity..

Vint’s mother, Paula Mae Rhodes Vint, was Scotch, Irish, and English while his father, Jesse Lee Vint Jr., was Austrian, German, Irish and Norman French.

Vint’s uncle, Edward Lee Vint, was a Texas Congressman that represented Austin County in the late 1930s.

Jesse Vint's father, Jesse L. Vint Jr., was the president of Unit Rig & Equipment Co., the second largest company in Tulsa, Oklahoma, working there from 1956 to 1982.  Jerry A. Shelton dedicated a book in his honor called The Unit Rig Story.

Vint joined the Actors Studio in Los Angeles with his brother Alan, who co-starred with him in Macon County Line. While at the Actors Studio, Vint was seen by Bruce Dern, who recommended him for his 1972 film Silent Running. Vint has worked with directors Arthur Penn in Little Big Man and  Roman Polanski in Chinatown.

Vint worked with David Carradine in three movies. In Carradine's autobiographical book Kill Bill: The Diary, Carradine described Jesse Vint as "an acting buddy of mine who is a very wise and cool dude," even though they were usually cast as rivals.

In addition to his work in the film industry, Vint won the World Celebrity Chess Championship at The Century Plaza Hotel in 1988.

In 2016, Vint was awarded a Lifetime Achievement Award by the Portland Indie Film Awards Ceremony at a sold-out event in Portland, Oregon.

Jesse Vint has been a lifetime voting member of the Academy of Motion Pictures Arts and Sciences (AMPAS) since 1982 and attends the Oscars frequently.

Jesse Vint was also inducted into the Oklahoma Hall of Fame along with his brother Alan Vint and the actor Ben Johnson in 2022.

Vint is also an author and has written several books: William the Conqueror vs. King Harold, The Brothers Reno, and The Film Actor’s Handbook.

Vint has a son named Jesse Lee Vint IV.  He also has a grandson named Jesse Lee Vint V.  Vint was married to Stephanie D. Pineo.

Selected filmography

Actor 

One Life to Live (TV, 1969) - Al Roberts (1986, 1987)
CBS Playhouse (TV, 1969) - Buck
WUSA (1970) - Young Doctor (uncredited)
The Bold Ones: The Senator (TV, 1970) - Pvt. Wilson
Swing Out, Sweet Land (John Wayne TV special, 1970) - Colorado
Little Big Man (1970) - Lieutenant 
Bonanza (TV, 1971) - Toby Harris
The Bold Ones: The Lawyers (TV, 1971) - Officer Taylor
Nichols (TV, 1971) - Charlie Springer
Silent Running (1972) - Andy Wolf
Owen Marshall: Counselor at Law (TV, 1971-1972) - Mechanic / Joe Boysen
Mission: Impossible (TV, 1973) - Zinc
Pigs (1973) - Sheriff Dan Cole
The F.B.I. (TV, 1971-1973) - Desmond Murphy / George Shawn / Johnny Nesbitt
Chopper One (TV, 1974) - Billy - 2nd Gunman
Welcome to Arrow Beach (1974) - Hot Rod Driver
Chinatown (1974) - Farmer in the Valley #2
Macon County Line (1974) - Wayne Dixon
The Rookies (TV, 1974) - Pete 'Wolf' Gray
The Disappearance of Flight 412 (1974) - Scanner
Cannon (TV, 1972-1974) - Al Sparling / Angel McIlhone
Earthquake (1974) - Buck
Reflections of Murder (1974) - Cop on Freeway
Amy Prentiss (TV, 1974) - Factory Supervisor
S.W.A.T. (TV, 1975) - Dallas
Bug (1975) - Tom Tacker
Bobbie Jo and the Outlaw (1976) - Slick Callahan
Black Oak Conspiracy (1977) - Jingo Johnson
Deathsport (1978) - Polna
Emergency! (TV, 1978) - Paramedic Nick Halverson
Centennial (TV miniseries, 1978) - Amos Calendar
Fast Charlie... the Moonbeam Rider (1979) - Calvin Hawk
Hometown U.S.A. (1979) - Motorcycle Leader
The Incredible Hulk (TV, 1979) - Tibby
Belle Starr (TV movie, 1980) - Bob Dalton
Walking Tall (TV, 1981) - Ben
CHiPs (TV, 1981) - Daws
Bret Maverick (TV, 1982) - Tulsa Jack Turner
Forbidden World (1982) - Mike Colby
Hart to Hart (TV, 1982) - Turk
T.J. Hooker (TV, 1982) - Ben Edwards
Dempsey (1983) - Bernie Dempsey
The Yellow Rose (1984) - Matt Colby
On the Line (1984) - El Jefe
Cover Up (TV, 1985) - Willard
Knight Rider (TV, 1985) - Hank Kagan
Trapper John, M.D. (TV, 1985) - Ben Cassidy
The A-Team (TV, 1986) - Insane Wayne
Another Chance (1989)
I Come in Peace (1990)
The New Adam-12 (TV, 1991)
Matlock (TV, 1992) - Tex
The Young Riders (TV, 1992) - Cody Pierce / Pierson
The Temp (1993) - Larry
Deep Red (1994) - Det. Rhodes
XXX's & OOO's (TV movie, 1994) - George Randall
Deep Cover (1997) - Ray
Dreamers (1999) - Carl
Beyond Belief: Fact or Fiction (1999) - Detective
Monkey Love (2002) - Les Roe
Operation Balikatan (2003) - CIA Chief Spencer
A-List (2006) - Red Carpet Star
Sister Mary's Angel (2011) - Father Henry
Grimm (TV, 2012) - Thom Carson
Gloria Jesus (2014) - Pastor Kruger
Bring Me the Head of Trapper Flint (2017) - Doctor Tulsa McCoy

Director/screenwriter 
Black Oak Conspiracy (1977)
Hometown U.S.A. (1979)
Another Chance (1989)
The Killer Within Me (2002)

References

External links 

Living people
University of Oklahoma alumni
Male actors from Tulsa, Oklahoma
Writers from Tulsa, Oklahoma
20th-century American male actors
21st-century American male actors
Actors Studio alumni
Writers from Vancouver, Washington
1940 births